Kitagata Hot Springs are natural hot springs in the Western Region of Uganda. The springs are said to have natural healing powers.

Location
The co-ordinates of Kitagata Hot Springs are 0°40'42.0"S, 30°09'38.0"E (Latitude:-0.678346; Longitude:30.160556).

Overview
There are two hot springs adjacent to each other. According to the locals, one of the springs was used by the former Omugabe (King of Ankole) and is known as Ekyomugabe. The other spring is believed to have healing powers and is known as Mulago, after Uganda's largest National Referral Hospital. Some locals drink the water.

Semi-naked men and women bathe in the warm waters of Kitagata Mulago, the spring believed to possess healing powers, sometimes as many as 200 in a day.

The road to this place is marrum and is located near a large swamp. The scenery is breath-taking with conical hills and inselbergs characterized with beautiful green vegetation of trees and grass. During the rainy season, the River Ngaromwenda which supplies water to the springs, floods and causes the Kitagata springs to be warm rather than hot.

Concern
Residents of Kitagata are concerned that the construction of the nearby Kagamba-Ishaka Road may harm the hot springs by exposing them to flooding.

See also
 Kitagata, Uganda
 Sheema District
 Ankole sub-region
 Western Region, Uganda

References

External links
 The Hot Springs In Western Uganda
Photo of Kitagata Hot Springs

Sheema District
Western Region, Uganda
Hot springs of Uganda